Ikkatteq (old spelling: Íkáteĸ) was a small village in the Sermersooq municipality in southeastern Greenland. It was abandoned in 2005.

Geography 

References 

Former populated places in Greenland
Populated places disestablished in 2005
ceb:Íkáteq (pulo)
sv:Íkáteq (ö)